Eseosa is an Edo-language given name, meaning 'gift of God'. Notable people with the name include:

Eseosa Aigbogun (born 1993), Swiss footballer
Eseosa Desalu (born 1994), Nigerian-Italian sprinter

Nigerian names